The 1898 Calgary municipal election was held on December 12, 1898 to elect a Mayor and nine Councilors to sit on the fifteenth Calgary City Council from January 3, 1899 to January 2, 1900.

Background
Voting rights were provided to any male, single woman, or widowed British subject over twenty-one years of age who are assessed on the last revised assessment roll with a minimum property value of $200.

The election was held under multiple non-transferable vote where each elector was able to cast a ballot for the mayor and up to three ballots for separate councillors with a voter's designated ward.

Results

Mayor

Councillors

Ward 1

Ward 2

Ward 3

By-elections
Councilor George Albert Allen submitted his resignation to City Council effective April 20, 1899. William Henry Cushing won a by-election held on May 8, 1899 defeating Crispin E. Smith 52-22.

See also
List of Calgary municipal elections

References

Municipal elections in Calgary
1898 elections in Canada
1890s in Calgary